The Wetar myzomela or crimson-hooded myzomela (Myzomela kuehni) is a species of bird in the family Meliphagidae.
It is endemic to Wetar.

Its natural habitats are subtropical or tropical moist lowland forests, subtropical or tropical moist shrubland, and rural gardens.
It is threatened by habitat loss.

References

crimson-hooded myzomela
 Birds of Wetar
crimson-hooded myzomela
 Taxonomy articles created by Polbot